Stony Creek is a river that flows into the Mohawk River in Vischer Ferry, New York.

References

Rivers of Saratoga County, New York
Rivers of New York (state)